The 13347 / 13348 Palamu Express is an Express train belonging to East Central Railway zone that runs between  and  in India. It is currently being operated with 13347/13348 train numbers on a daily basis.

Service

The 13347/Palamu Express has an average speed of 40 km/hr and covers 481 km in 12h 10m. The 13348/Palamu Express has an average speed of 42 km/hr and covers 481 km in 11h 20m.

Route and halts 

The important halts of the train are:

 
 
 

 

 Barwadih
 
 Garwa Road Junction railway station

Coach composition

The train has standard ICF rakes with max speed of 110 kmph. The train consists of 24 coaches :

 2 AC III Tier
 4 Sleeper coaches
 10 General
 4 Seating cum Luggage Rake

Traction

Both trains are hauled by a Mughalsarai-based WAP-4 electric locomotive from Patna Junction to Barkakana Junction and vice versa.

Direction reversal

Train reverses its direction once at;

 .

See also 

 Rajendra Nagar Terminal railway station
 Barkakana Junction railway station
 Maurya Express

Notes

External links 

 13347/Palamu Express
 13348/Palamu Express

References 

Transport in Patna
Named passenger trains of India
Rail transport in Jharkhand
Rail transport in Bihar
Express trains in India